Katy Balls (born 1989) is a British journalist. She is political editor of The Spectator.

Early life
Born in Aberdeen, Balls grew up in North Berwick and attended North Berwick High School. She then studied philosophy at the University of Durham, writing for the college paper Palatinate on travel and music.

Career

Balls' media career began at The Daily Telegraph with the Mandrake column.

She was diary editor at The Spectator and became a political correspondent for it in December 2016, and was appointed deputy political editor in January 2019. She became political editor in January 2023.

Balls writes a fortnightly column on Westminster politics for the I. It was nominated for Political Commentary of the Year at the 2017 Press Awards.

She currently hosts a podcast entitled Women With Balls.

Balls has made several television appearances, including The Bolt Report, Good Morning Britain, Sky News, Politics Live, The Andrew Marr Show and Have I Got News for You.

On 4 January 2023, Balls announced she was appointed political editor of The Spectator.

Personal life 
Balls is married to Max Bye, son of Ruby Wax,  but had her wedding delayed due to COVID.

References

External links

People from Aberdeen
People from North Berwick
People educated at North Berwick High School
Alumni of Durham University
British political journalists
21st-century British journalists
British women journalists
The Spectator people
The Daily Telegraph people
Living people
1989 births